The Sri Lanka cricket team toured India from October to December 1975. Sri Lanka did not then have Test status, but three four-day unofficial Tests were played, India winning 2–0. The tour also included six other first-class matches.

The Sri Lankan team

Anura Tennekoon (captain)
David Heyn (vice-captain)
Dennis Chanmugam
Amitha de Costa
Somachandra de Silva
Ajit de Silva
Roy Dias
Ranjit Fernando
Mahes Goonatilleke
Russell Hamer
Lalith Kaluperuma
Duleep Mendis
Tony Opatha
Anura Ranasinghe
Daya Sahabandu
Bandula Warnapura
Sunil Wettimuny

The manager was Neil Perera and the assistant manager was Abu Fuard.

References

External links
 Sri Lanka in India, 1975-76 at Cricinfo

1975 in Indian cricket
1975 in Sri Lankan cricket
1975–76
Indian cricket seasons from 1970–71 to 1999–2000
International cricket competitions from 1975–76 to 1980